The 2003 World Group Play-offs decided which nations featured in World Group in the 2004 Fed Cup. The play-off winners went on to feature in World Group in 2004, while the losing nations joined Zonal Competition for 2004.

Argentina vs. Hungary

Australia vs. Colombia

Austria vs. Canada

Croatia vs. Brazil

South Africa vs. Czech Republic

Indonesia vs. Germany

Japan vs. Sweden

Switzerland vs. Israel

References

See also
Fed Cup structure

World Group Play-offs